Pauline Duhault is a French film producer.

Filmography
 Drancy Avenir, (1997)
 Jeanne and the Perfect Guy, (1998)
 Le New Yorker, (1998)
 Beach Cafe, (2001)
 Glowing Eyes, (2002)
 Mister V., (2003)
 Amateurs, (2003)
 Sois jeune et tais-toi, (2003, short)
 A Year in My Life, (2006)
 Before I Forget, (2007)
 Fragile(s), (2007)
 The Easy Way, (2008)
 Itinéraire bis, (2011)
 Quand je serai petit, (2012)
 Cookie, (2013)
 Encore heureux, (2015)
 The African Doctor, (2016)
 Smile, (2016, short)
 Bon enfant, (2020, short)

References

French women film producers
Year of birth missing (living people)
Living people